Dharavi is a suburb in Mumbai, Maharashtra, India. It has often been considered to be one of the world's largest slums.

The Dharavi slum was founded in 1884 during the British colonial era, and grew because the expulsion of factories and residents from the peninsular city centre by the colonial government and from the migration of rural Indians into urban Mumbai.  For this reason, Dharavi is currently a highly diverse settlement religiously and ethnically.

Dharavi has an active informal economy in which numerous household enterprises employ many of the slum residents—leather, textiles and pottery products are among the goods made inside Dharavi. The total annual turnover has been estimated at over 1 billion.

Dharavi has suffered from many epidemics and other disasters, including a widespread plague in 1896 which killed over half of the population of Bombay. Sanitation in the slums remains poor.

Dharavi is often compared to Orangi slum in Karachi. While Orangi has double the population of Dharavi, it is spread over an area of 60 sq.km, about 30 times that of Dharavi. Effectively, Orangi slum dwellers have 15 times more land per capita than Dharavi.

History
In the 18th century, Dharavi was an island with a predominantly mangrove swamp. It was a sparsely populated village before the late 19th century, inhabited by Koli fishermen. Dharavi was then referred to as the village of Koliwada.

Colonial era
In the 1850s, after decades of urban growth under East India Company and British Raj, the city's population reached half a million. The urban area then covered mostly the southern extension of Bombay peninsula, the population density was over 10 times higher than London at that time.

The most polluting industries were tanneries, and the first tannery moved from peninsular Bombay into Dharavi in 1887. People who worked with leather, typically a profession of lowest Hindu castes and of Muslim Indians, moved into Dharavi. Other early settlers included the Kumbhars, a large Gujarati community of potters. The colonial government granted them a 99-year land-lease in 1895. Rural migrants looking for jobs poured into Bombay, and its population soared past 1 million. Other artisans, like the embroidery workers from Uttar Pradesh, started the ready-made garments trade. These industries created jobs, labor moved in, but there was no government effort to plan or invest in any infrastructure in or near Dharavi. The living quarters and small scale factories grew haphazardly, without provision for sanitation, drains, safe drinking water, roads or other basic services. But some ethnic, caste and religious communities that have settled in Dharavi at that time helped build the settlement of Dharavi, by forming organizations and political parties, building school and temples, constructing homes and factories. Dharavi's first mosque, Badi Masjid, started in 1887 and the oldest Hindu temple, Ganesh Mandir, was built in 1913.

Post-independence
At India's independence from colonial rule in 1947, Dharavi had grown to be the largest slum in Bombay and all of India. It still had a few empty spaces, which continued to serve as waste-dumping grounds for operators across the city. Bombay, meanwhile, continued to grow as a city. Soon Dharavi was surrounded by the city, and became a key hub for informal economy. Starting from the 1950s, proposals for Dharavi redevelopment plans periodically came out, but most of these plans failed because of lack of financial banking and/or political support. Dharavi's Co-operative Housing Society was formed in the 1960s to uplift the lives of thousands of slum dwellers by the initiative of Shri. M.V. Duraiswamy, a well-known social worker and Congress leader of that region. The society promoted 338 flats and 97 shops and was named as Dr. Baliga Nagar.

Redevelopment plan 

There have been many plans since 1997 to redevelop Dharavi like the former slums of Hong Kong such as Tai Hang. In 2004, the cost of redevelopment was estimated to be . Companies from around the world have bid to redevelop Dharavi, including Lehman Brothers, Dubai's Limitless and Singapore's Capitaland Ltd. In 2010, it was estimated to cost  to redevelop.

The latest urban redevelopment plan proposed for the Dharavi area is managed by American-trained architect Mukesh Mehta. There is still a significant local opposition to the plans, largely because existing residents still feel  of revised permanent alternate accommodation per tenant is not adequate each. Furthermore, only those families who lived in the area before 2000 are slated for resettlement. Concerns have also been raised by residents who fear that some of their small businesses in the "informal" sector may not be relocated under the redevelopment plan. Due to this opposition, a trust has been proposed called the Dharavi Community Land Trust that will be made up of community members, landowners and neighborhood associations.

In 2008 German students Jens Kaercher and Lucas Schwind won a Next Generation prize for their innovative redevelopment strategy designed to protect the current residents from needing to relocate.

Other redevelopment schemes include the "Dharavi Masterplan" devised by British architectural and engineering firm Foster + Partners, that proposes "double-height spaces that create an intricate vertical landscape and reflect the community's way of life" built-in phases that the firm says would "eliminate the need for transit camps," instead catalyzing the rehabilitation of Dharavi "from within."

A Dubai-based firm, SecLink Group, has planned to redevelop the slum into a completely new area. On setting up of the SPV, the private firm will have to bring in the equity of Rs 400 crore, while the state government will invest another Rs 100 crore. The company planning to do it is also building infrastructure and affordable housing projects in Singapore and Dubai. Following the empowered committee's nod, the senior state officials said that an MoU will soon be executed between the state government, and the Dharavi Redevelopment Project Authority (DRPA) and the company. With an almost estimated cost of over Rs 26,000 crore, the Dharavi makeover project is the biggest brownfield redevelopment project in India. To make the redevelopment more economically viable, the state government's plan is involving transforming the region into a hub for commercial and business activity. Dharavi is close to the Bandra Kurla Complex, which is India's richest business district and one of the richest in Asia.

Demographics
The total current population of Dharavi slum is unknown because of floating population of migrant workers, albeit voter turnout of 2019 state legislative assembly election was 119,092 (Average 60% turnout). Some sources suggest it is 300,000 to about a million. With a literacy rate of 69%, Dharavi is the most literate slum in India.

Dharavi has a sizable population of Tamilians, mainly from the southern districts of Tamil Nadu such as Ramanathapuram, Tirunelveli, Thoothukudi, and Pudukottai. Nevertheless, Dharavi has a majority of Marathi- and Hindi-speaking population.

About 40% of the population of Dharavi is Muslim, compared to 19% in Mumbai overall. The Christian population is estimated to be about 6%, while the rest are predominantly Hindus (53%), with some Buddhists and other minority religions. Among the Hindus, about 20% work on animal skin production, tanneries and leather goods. Other Hindus specialise in pottery work, textile goods manufacturing, retail and trade, distilleries and other caste professions – all of these as small-scale household operations. The slum residents are from all over India, people who migrated from rural regions of many different states. The slum has numerous mosques, temples and churches to serve people of Islam, Hindu and Christian faiths; with Badi Masjid, a mosque, as the oldest religious structure in Dharavi.

Location and characteristics
 
Dharavi is a large area situated between Mumbai's two main suburban railway lines, the Western and Central Railways. It is also adjacent to Mumbai Airport. To the west of Dharavi are Mahim and Bandra, and to the north lies the Mithi River. The Mithi River empties into the Arabian Sea through the Mahim Creek. The area of Antop Hill lies to the east while the locality called Matunga is located in the South. Due to its location and poor sewage and drainage systems, Dharavi particularly becomes vulnerable to floods during the wet season.

Dharavi is considered one of the largest slums in the world. The low-rise building style and narrow street structure of the area make Dharavi very cramped and confined. Like most slums, it is overpopulated.

Economy

In addition to the traditional pottery and textile industries in Dharavi, there is an increasingly large recycling industry, processing recyclable waste from other parts of Mumbai. Recycling in Dharavi is reported to employ approximately 250,000 people. While recycling is a major industry in the neighborhood, it is also reported to be a source of heavy pollution in the area. The district has an estimated 5,000 businesses and 15,000 single-room factories. Two major suburban railways feed into Dharavi, making it an important commuting station for people in the area going to and from work.

Dharavi exports goods around the world. Often these consist of various leather products, jewellery, various accessories, and textiles. Markets for Dharavi's goods include stores in the United States, Europe, and the Middle East. The total (and largely informal economy) turnover is estimated to be between 500 million, and 650 million per year, to over 1 billion per year. The per capita income of the residents, depending on estimated population range of 300,000 to about 1 million, ranges between US$500 and US$2,000 per year.

A few travel operators offer guided tours through Dharavi, showing the industrial and the residential part of Dharavi and explaining about the problems and challenges Dharavi is facing. These tours give a deeper insight into a slum in general and Dharavi in particular.

Utility services 
Potable water is supplied by the MCGM to Dharavi and the whole of Mumbai. However, a large amount of water is lost due to water thefts, illegal connection and leakage. The community also has a number of water wells that are sources of non-potable water.

Cooking gas is supplied in the form of liquefied petroleum gas cylinders sold by state-owned oil companies, as well as through piped natural gas supplied by Mahanagar Gas Limited.

There are settlement houses that still do not have legal connections to the utility service and thus rely on illegal connection to the water and power supply which means a water and power shortage for the residents in Dharavi.

Sanitation issues

Dharavi has severe problems with public health. Water access derives from public standpipes stationed throughout the slum. Additionally, with the limited lavatories they have, they are extremely filthy and broken down to the point of being unsafe. Mahim Creek is a local river that is widely used by local residents for urination and defecation causing the spread of contagious diseases. The open sewers in the city drain to the creek causing a spike in water pollutants, septic conditions, and foul odors. Due to the air pollutants, diseases such as lung cancer, tuberculosis, and asthma are common among residents. There are government proposals in regards to improving Dharavi's sanitation issues. The residents have a section where they wash their clothes in water that people defecate in. This spreads the amount of disease as doctors have to deal with over 4,000 cases of typhoid a day. In a 2006 Human Development Report by the UN, they estimated there was an average of 1 toilet for every 1,440 people.

Epidemics and other disasters
Dharavi has experienced a long history of epidemics and natural disasters, sometimes with significant loss of lives. The first plague to devastate Dharavi, along with other settlements of Mumbai, happened in 1896, when nearly half of the population died. A series of plagues and other epidemics continued to affect Dharavi, and Mumbai in general, for the next 25 years, with high rates of mortality. Dysentery epidemics have been common throughout the years and explained by the high population density of Dharavi. Other reported epidemics include typhoid, cholera, leprosy, amoebiasis and polio. For example, in 1986, a cholera epidemic was reported, where most patients were children of Dharavi. Typical patients to arrive in hospitals were in late and critical care condition, and the mortality rates were abnormally high. In recent years, cases of drug resistant tuberculosis have been reported in Dharavi.

Fires and other disasters are common. For example, in January 2013, a fire destroyed many slum properties and caused injuries. In 2005, massive floods caused deaths and extensive property damage.

The COVID-19 pandemic also affected the slum. The first case was reported in April 2020.

In the media

In the West, Dharavi was most notably used as the backdrop in the British film Slumdog Millionaire (2008). It has also been depicted in a number of Indian films, including Deewaar (1975), Nayakan (1987), Salaam Bombay! (1988), Parinda (1989), Dharavi (1991), Bombay (1995), Ram Gopal Varma's "Indian Gangster Trilogy" (1998–2005), the Sarkar series (2005–2017), Footpath (2003), Black Friday (2004), Mumbai Xpress (2005), No Smoking (2007), Traffic Signal (2007), Aamir (2008), Mankatha (2011), Thalaivaa (2013), Bhoothnath Returns (2014), Kaala (2018) and Gully Boy (2019).

Dharavi, Slum for Sale (2009) by Lutz Konermann and Rob Appleby is a German documentary. In a programme aired in the United Kingdom in January 2010, Kevin McCloud and Channel 4 aired a two-part series titled Slumming It which centered around Dharavi and its inhabitants. The poem "Blessing" by Imtiaz Dharker is about Dharavi not having enough water. For The Win, by Cory Doctorow, is partially set in Dharavi. In 2014, Belgian researcher Katrien Vankrunkelsven made a 22-minute film on Dharavi which is entitled The Way of Dharavi.

Hitman 2, a video game released in 2018, featured the slums of Mumbai in one of its missions.
The Mumbai based video game Mumbai Gullies is expected to feature the slums of Dharavi in the fictional map.

See also
 Poverty in India
 List of slums in India
 Urbanisation in India

References

Dharavi: Documenting Informalities. Practical Action June 2018. Jonatan Habib Engqvist and Maria Lantz.

Further reading

 Sharma, Kalpana; "Rediscovering Dharavi: Story From Asia's Largest Slum" (2000) – Penguin Books 
 "Life in a Slum" – BBC News
 
 "Urban poverty in India: A flourishing slum" and "Recycling: A soul-searching business", The Economist, 19 December 2007
 Everyone Wants a Slice of the Dharavi Pie – Live Mint
 Facts About Asia's Largest Slum, Dharavi, Mumbai - TabloidXO

External links
 dharavi.org: A participatory site on Dharavi

Neighbourhoods in Mumbai
Slums of Mumbai
Squatting in India